Elisha Vanslyck Cook Jr. (December 26, 1903 – May 18, 1995) was an American character actor famed for his work in films noirs.  According to Bill Georgaris of TSPDT: They Shoot Pictures, Don't They, Cook appeared in a total of 21 films noir, more than any other actor or actress.  He played cheerful, brainy collegiates until he was cast against type as the bug-eyed baby-faced psychopathic killer Wilmer Cook in the 1941 version of The Maltese Falcon.  He went on to play deceptively mild-mannered villains. Cook's acting career spanned more than 60 years, with roles in productions including The Big Sleep, Shane, The Killing, House on Haunted Hill, and Rosemary's Baby.

Early life, stage, and military service

Cook was born in December 1903 in San Francisco, California, the son of Elisha Vanslyck Cook Sr., a pharmacist, and grew up in Chicago.  He first worked in theater lobbies selling programs, but by the age of 14 he was already performing in vaudeville and stock.   As a young man, he traveled and honed his acting skills on stages along the East Coast and in the Midwest before arriving in New York City, where in 1926 he debuted on Broadway in Hello, Lola. Some other Broadway productions in which Cook performed were Henry-Behave (1926), Kingdom of God (1928), Her Unborn Child (1928), Many a Slip (1930), Privilege Car (1931), Lost Boy (1932), Merry-Go-Round (1932), and Chrysalis (1932). Then, in 1933, Eugene O'Neill cast him in the role of Richard Miller in his play Ah, Wilderness, which ran on Broadway for two years.  Cook continued to appear on stage during the remainder of the 1930s; and although his acting career after that focused increasingly on films and then on television roles, he periodically returned to Broadway, where as late as 1963 he performed as Giuseppe Givola in Bertolt Brecht's play The Resistible Rise of Arturo Ui.

Cook enlisted in the United States Army in Los Angeles, California, on August 15, 1942.  According to his enlistment record he stood 5-feet-5-inches tall and weighed 123 pounds.  Cook's military record documents his level of education at "3 years of high school."  Some online references state that he had attended "St. Albans College," "The Chicago Academy of Dramatic Art," and "The Chicago Academy of Fine Arts," which had been renamed the Art Institute of Chicago in 1882.

Career in film
In 1930, Cook traveled to California, where he made his film debut in Hollywood's version of the play Her Unborn Child, a motion picture directed by Albert Ray and produced by Windsor Picture Plays Inc.  

At Twentieth Century-Fox, Cook made an impression as a bespectacled college freshman with radical ideas in the musical comedy Pigskin Parade (1936). He was also featured in the unofficial sequel, Life Begins in College (1937).  Cook remained at Fox for two years, and then began freelancing at other studios. He did return to Fox occasionally in prominent roles: as a songwriter in the Alice Faye-Betty Grable musical Tin Pan Alley (1940), and as a mobster disguised as an old woman in the Laurel and Hardy feature A-Haunting We Will Go (1942). Typical of his early, bookish roles was his turn as a meek screenwriter in the madcap Olsen and Johnson comedy Hellzapoppin (1941).

After The Maltese Falcon, Cook became typecast again, as weaklings or sadistic losers and hoodlums, who in the plots were usually murdered, either being strangled, poisoned or shot. In Universal's Phantom Lady (1944), he portrays a slimy, intoxicated nightclub-orchestra drummer to memorable effect. He received excellent notices for his portrayal of a happy, breezy disc jockey who turns out to be a homicidal maniac in The Falcon's Alibi (1946). He also had a substantial, though uncredited role as Bobo in the 1953 film noir production I, the Jury. 

In addition to his performance as Wilmer in The Maltese Falcon (1941), some of Cook's other notable roles include the doomed informant Harry Jones in The Big Sleep (1946), the henchman (Marty Waterman) of the murderous title character in Born to Kill (1947), the pugnacious ex-Confederate soldier 'Stonewall' Torrey who is gunned down by Jack Palance in Shane (1953), and George Peatty, the shady, cuckolded husband in Stanley Kubrick's The Killing (1956).  Other films in which he appeared are William Castle's horror film House on Haunted Hill (1959), One-Eyed Jacks (1961), Papa's Delicate Condition (1963), Blood on the Arrow (1964), Rosemary's Baby (1968), The Great Bank Robbery (1969), El Condor (1970), Blacula (1972), The Great Northfield Minnesota Raid (1972), Pat Garrett and Billy the Kid (1973), The Outfit (1973), Tom Horn (1980), and Treasure: In Search of the Golden Horse (1984).

Television
Cook appeared on a wide variety of American television series from the early 1950s to the late 1980s.  He played a private detective, Homer Garrity, in an episode of Adventures of Superman television series titled "Semi-Private Eye," airing for the first time on January 16, 1954. That same year, on April 12, he guest-starred on NBC's The Dennis Day Show.  In 1960, he was cast in the episode "The Hermit" of the ABC sitcom The Real McCoys with Walter Brennan. He appeared too in 1960 as Jeremy Hake in the episode "The Bequest" of the ABC western series The Rebel, which starred Nick Adams. He also portrayed the character Gideon McCoy in the 1966 episode "The Night of the Bars of Hell" on The Wild Wild West. He performed as well in the second episode of ABC's crime drama The Fugitive.

Cook made two guest appearances on the CBS courtroom drama series Perry Mason.  In 1958, he played Art Crowley in "The Case of the Pint-Sized Client", and in 1964 he played Reelin' Peter Rockwell in "The Case of the Reckless Rockhound". Cook portrayed lawyer Samuel T. Cogley in the Star Trek 1967 episode "Court Martial", Isaac Isaacson on the Batman television series, Weasel Craig in Salem's Lot, and later had a long-term recurring role as Honolulu crime lord "Ice Pick" on CBS's Magnum, P.I. In 1974 he made a surprise guest appearance on The Odd Couple as government agent Eliot Ness. He appeared too in The Bionic Woman episode "Once a Thief" in 1977.

Toward the end of his life, Cook often played dimwitted or cranky elderly characters. He played a bum in an episode of The A-Team as well as an elderly uncle in an episode of Alf, which was one of his last roles prior to his retirement entirely from acting in 1988, followed by his death seven years later.

Personal life
Cook was married to singer Mary Gertrude Dunckley (known professionally as Mary Lou Cook of the popular vocal quartet The Merry Macs) from 1928 until their divorce on November 4, 1941.  He then married Illinois native Elvira Ann (Peggy) McKenna in 1943. The couple were married for twenty-five years until they formally divorced in Inyo County, California, in February 1968. They remarried on December 30, 1971. Their second marriage lasted another nineteen years until Peggy's death on December 23, 1990. Various references about Cook state that he had no children from his marriages; yet, his army enlistment record of 1942 documents his marital status as "Divorced, with dependents," which suggests he may have had a child or children with his first wife, or been responsible for the well-being of others. 

Cook never became part of the Hollywood social scene, which he held in low regard. His slight build and calm demeanor belied his offscreen status as a rugged outdoorsman. He resided for many years in Bishop, California, but he typically spent his summers at Lake Sabrina in the Sierra Nevada. According to John Huston, who in 1941 directed him in The Maltese Falcon:
[Cook] lived alone up in the High Sierra, tied flies and caught golden trout between films. When he was wanted in Hollywood, they sent word up to his mountain cabin by courier. He would come down, do a picture, and then withdraw again to his retreat.

Death
Elisha Cook, Jr. died of a stroke at age 91, on May 18, 1995, at a nursing home in Big Pine, California.  He was the last surviving member of the main cast of The Maltese Falcon.

Complete filmography

Her Unborn Child (1930) as Stewart Kennedy (film debut)
Chills and Fever (1930 short) as Member of the Glee Club (uncredited)
Honor Among Lovers (1931) as Office Boy (uncredited)
Two in a Crowd (1936) as Skeeter
Pigskin Parade (1936) as Herbert Van Dyke
Breezing Home (1937) as Pete Espinosa (uncredited)
Love Is News (1937) as Egbert Eggleston
The Devil Is Driving (1937) as Tony Stevens
They Won't Forget (1937) as Joe Turner
Wife, Doctor and Nurse (1937) as Glen Wylie
Danger - Love at Work (1937) as Chemist
Life Begins in College (1937) as Ollie Stearns
Thoroughbreds Don't Cry (1937) as Boots Maguire (uncredited)
Three Blind Mice (1938) as Boy on Bench (uncredited)
My Lucky Star (1938) as Waldo
Submarine Patrol (1938) as Seaman Rutherford Davis Pratt, aka 'The Professor'
Newsboys' Home (1938) as Danny
Grand Jury Secrets (1939) as Robert Austin / Norman Hazlitt
He Married His Wife (1940) as Dicky Brown
Stranger on the Third Floor (1940) as Joe Briggs
Public Deb No. 1 (1940) as Communist
Tin Pan Alley (1940) as Joe Codd
Love Crazy (1941) as Elevator Man
Sergeant York (1941) as Piano Player (uncredited)
Man at Large (1941) as Hotel Clerk
The Maltese Falcon (1941) as Wilmer Cook
I Wake Up Screaming (1941) as Harry Williams
Hellzapoppin' (1941) as Harry Selby
Ball of Fire (1941) as Waiter
A Gentleman at Heart (1942) as Genius
Sleepytime Gal (1942) as Ernie
A-Haunting We Will Go (1942) as Frank Lucas
Wildcat (1942) as Harold 'Chicopee' Nevins
Manila Calling (1942) as Gillman
Kill or Be Killed (1942)
Baptism of Fire (1943 documentary) as Bill
Phantom Lady (1944) as Cliff
Up in Arms (1944) as Info Jones
Dark Mountain (1944) as Whitey
Dark Waters (1944) as Cleeve
Dillinger (1945) as Kirk Otto
Why Girls Leave Home (1945) as Jimmy Lobo
Blonde Alibi (1946) as Sam Collins
Cinderella Jones (1946) as Oliver S. Patch
The Falcon's Alibi (1946) as Nick
Joe Palooka, Champ (1946) as Eugene
Two Smart People (1946) as Fly Feletti
The Big Sleep (1946) as Harry Jones
Fall Guy (1947) as Joe
Born to Kill (1947) as Marty
The Long Night (1947) as Frank Dunlap
The Gangster (1947) as Oval
Flaxy Martin (1949) as Roper
The Great Gatsby (1949) as Klipspringer
Behave Yourself (1951) as Albert Jonas
Don't Bother to Knock (1952) as Eddie Forbes
Shane (1953) as Stonewall Torrey
I, the Jury (1953) as Bobo (uncredited)
Thunder Over the Plains (1953) as Joseph Standish
The Outlaw's Daughter (1954) as Lewis 'Tulsa' Cook
Drum Beat (1954) as Blaine Crackel
Timberjack (1955) as Punky
Trial (1955) as Finn
The Indian Fighter (1955) as Briggs
Indian Agent (1955, TV movie) as Pete, the Cavalry Scout (uncredited)
The Killing (1956) as George Peatty
Accused of Murder (1956) as "Whitey" Pollock
Voodoo Island (1957) as Martin Schuyler
The Lonely Man (1957) as Willie 
Chicago Confidential (1957) as Candymouth Duggan
Plunder Road (1957) as Skeets Jonas
Baby Face Nelson (1957) as Homer van Meter
House on Haunted Hill (1959) as Watson Pritchard 
Day of the Outlaw (1959) as Larry Teter (town barber)
Platinum High School (1960) as Harry Nesbit
College Confidential (1960) as Ted Blake
One-Eyed Jacks (1961) as Carvey 
Papa's Delicate Condition (1963) as Mr. Keith
Black Zoo (1963) as Joe
The Haunted Palace (1963) as Peter Smith / Micah Smith 
Johnny Cool (1963) as Undertaker
The Judge (1963, TV movie) 
The Glass Cage (1964) as Girl's father
Blood on the Arrow (1964) as Tex
McNab's Lab (1966, TV movie) as Coach
The Spy in the Green Hat (1967) as Arnold
Welcome to Hard Times (1967) as Hanson
Rosemary's Baby (1968) as Mr. Nicklas 
Cry for Poor Wally (1969) as Preacher
The Great Bank Robbery (1969) as Jeb
The Movie Murderer (1970, TV movie) as Willie Peanuts
El Condor (1970) as Old Convict
Night Slaves (1970, TV movie)
Night Chase (1970, TV movie) as Proprietor
The Scarecrow (1972, TV movie) as Micah
The Night Stalker (1972, TV movie) as Mickey Crawford
The Great Northfield Minnesota Raid (1972) as Bunker
Blacula (1972) as Sam
Messiah of Evil (1973) as Charlie
Pat Garrett & Billy the Kid (1973) as Cody
Emperor of the North Pole (1973) as Gray Cat 
Electra Glide in Blue (1973) as Willie
The Outfit (1973) as Carl
The Phantom of Hollywood (1974, TV movie) as Studio Engineer (uncredited)
Winterhawk (1975) as Finley
The Black Bird (1975) as Wilmer Cook
St. Ives (1976) as Eddie
Dead of Night (1977, TV movie) as Karel
Mad Bull (1977, TV movie) as Sweeper
The Champ (1979) as Georgie 
Salem's Lot (1979, TV movie) as Gordon "Weasel" Phillips 
1941 (1979) as The Patron (Dexter)
Tom Horn (1980) as Stablehand
Carny (1980) as On-Your-Mark
Harry's War (1981) as Sgt. Billy
Leave 'em Laughing (1981 TV movie) as Jetter
National Lampoon's Movie Madness (1982) as Mousy ("Municipalians") 
Hammett (1982) as Eli the Taxi Driver
Terror at Alcatraz (1982, TV movie) as Hotel Desk Clerk
This Girl for Hire (1983, TV movie) as Eddie
Shadow of Sam Penny (1983, TV movie) as Dutch Silver
Off Sides (Pigs vs. Freaks) (1984, TV movie) as Novatney
It Came Upon the Midnight Clear (1984, TV movie) as Mr. Bibbs
Treasure: In Search of the Golden Horse (1984) as Mr. Maps
The Man Who Broke 1,000 Chains (1987, TV movie) as Pappy Glue

Television credits

Adventures of Superman in "Semi-Private Eye," (January 16, 1954) as Homer Garrity, 
Alfred Hitchcock Presents in "Salvage" (1955) as Shorty
The Life and Legend of Wyatt Earp as "Guns" McCallum
Perry Mason in "The Case of the Pint-Sized Client" (1958) as Art Crowley
Gunsmoke in "Matt for Murder" (1958) as Huggins 
Gunsmoke in "Odd Man Out" (1959) as Cyrus Tucker
Rawhide (1959) as Bain
Bat Masterson in "No Funeral For Thorn" (1959) as Thorn Loomis (playing Bat’s long time friend in a rare “good guy” role)
The Real McCoys in "The Hermit" (1960) as Harry
’’Peter Gunn’’ in “The Long Long Ride” (1960) as Snooker
Wagon Train in "The Tracy Sadler Story" (1960) as Cadge Waldo
Tightrope in "The Long Odds" (1960) as Sam Parker
The Rebel in "The Bequest" (1960) as Jeremy Hake
Thriller in "The Fatal Impulse" (1960) as The Assassin
The Islanders in "The Twenty-Six Paper" (1961) as Tomas 
Surfside 6 in "Witness for the Defense" (1961) as Mike Pulaski 
The Deputy in "Brand of Honesty" (1961) as Miller
Laramie in "The Tumbleweed Wagon" (1961) as Doc
Outlaws in "The Dark Sunrise of Griff Kincaid" (1962) as Cully
The Dakotas in "A Nice Girl from Goliath" (1963) as Brinkman
Gunsmoke in "Hung High" (1964) as George
Gunsmoke in "Breckinridge" (1965) as Jackie Beal (S10E25)
The Wild Wild West in "The Night of the Bars of Hell" (1966) as Gideon McCoy
Star Trek in "Court Martial" (1967) as Samuel T. Cogley, Esq 
The Odd Couple in "Our Fathers" (1974) as Eliot Ness
Starsky & Hutch in "Lady Blue" (1975) as Polly the snitch
The Bionic Woman in "Once a Thief" (1977) as Inky (credited as Elisha Cook)
Insight in "The Trouble with Grandpa" (1982) as Grandpa
Magnum, P.I. (1980s) as Francis "Ice Pick" Hofstetler in 13 episodes (final television appearance)
Night Court in "Married Alive" (1985) as Wilbur Posten
The Twilight Zone in "Welcome to Winfield" (1986) as Weldon
The A-Team (1985) in Season 4 Ep. 5 "Road To Hope" as Jim Beam
ALF in "We're So Sorry, Uncle Albert" (1988) as Uncle Albert

 [Tombstone Territory] (1957-1960) season 3, Ep. 84 “The Witness” (1960) as Adam Kirby

References

Further reading

External links

 
 
 Elisha Cook Jr. at Turner Classic Movies

1903 births
1995 deaths
20th-century American male actors
American male film actors
American male stage actors
American male television actors
Military personnel from California
Male actors from Chicago
Male actors from San Francisco
Male Western (genre) film actors
United States Army personnel of World War II
Vaudeville performers
Western (genre) television actors